The 1961–62 Iowa Hawkeyes men's basketball team represented the University of Iowa in intercollegiate basketball during the 1961–62 season. The team was led by head coach Sharm Scheuerman and played their home games at the Iowa Field House. The Hawkeyes finished the season 13–11 and were 7–7 in Big Ten conference games.

Roster

Schedule/results

|-
!colspan=9 style=| Non-conference Regular Season

|-
!colspan=9 style=| Big Ten Regular Season

Awards and honors
Don Nelson – Third-Team All-American

Team players in the 1962 NBA Draft

References

Iowa Hawkeyes men's basketball seasons
Iowa
Hawkeyes
Hawkeyes